Brachylomia algens is a species of cutworm or dart moth in the family Noctuidae. It is found in North America.

The MONA or Hodges number for Brachylomia algens is 9998.

References

Further reading

 
 
 

Brachylomia
Articles created by Qbugbot
Moths described in 1878